Kyle Greig (born February 22, 1990) is an American soccer player who plays as a forward.

Career
Greig played four years of college soccer at Benedictine College between 2008 and 2011. He also played for USL PDL club Kansas City Brass between 2010 and 2012.

Greig signed his first professional contract with USL Pro club Wilmington Hammerheads in April 2013. He made his debut and scored his first professional goal on April 19, 2013, during a 2-0 victory over Antigua Barracuda FC.

After two seasons with Oklahoma City Energy, Greig signed with Whitecaps FC 2 on January 29, 2016. He made the move to the Whitecaps senior team in Major League Soccer on December 19, 2016.

During the 2017 season, Greig was loaned out to United Soccer League club FC Cincinnati. His loan ended when FC Cincinnati's 2017 season ended.

Greig joined USL club Saint Louis FC on February 21, 2018. Saint Louis FC folded following the 2020 USL Championship season.

On May 20, 2021, it was announced that Greig had signed with Louisville City. Following the 2021 season, Louisville opted to decline their contract option on Greig.

Greig signed with the Tampa Bay Rowdies on January 14, 2022. He was released by Tampa following their 2022 season.

References

External links
 
 
 

1990 births
Living people
American soccer players
Association football forwards
FC Cincinnati (2016–18) players
Kansas City Brass players
Louisville City FC players
OKC Energy FC players
Sportspeople from Olathe, Kansas
People from Stevens Point, Wisconsin
Saint Louis FC players
Soccer players from Kansas
Soccer players from Wisconsin
Tampa Bay Rowdies players
USL Championship players
USL League Two players
Vancouver Whitecaps FC players
Whitecaps FC 2 players
Wilmington Hammerheads FC players